The National Assembly is one of the two houses (chambers) of the Parliament of Cambodia. It is referred to as the lower house, with the Senate being referred to as the upper house.

The National Assembly is an elected body consisting of 125 members known as Members of Parliament (MPs). Members are elected for five-year terms by party-list proportional representation, using provinces as constituencies of 1 to 18 members, and the D'Hondt method of seat distribution. A political party must secure 63 seats to obtain and preserve a majority.

The National Assembly is headed by the President, currently Heng Samrin. The sixth National Assembly was inaugurated on 6 September 2018, and presided by King Norodom Sihamoni.

History

  
 
The current National Assembly originated as the Constituent Assembly, a legislative body elected during the United Nations Transitional Authority in Cambodia (UNTAC). After the 1993 election, the Assembly met and adopted a new constitution for Cambodia. After enactment of the 1993 Constitution, the Constituent Assembly was renamed the National Assembly.

 Cambodia held its first elections in history on 1 September 1946. The Democrats won a majority of seats in the legislature.
 Cambodia was proclaimed a constitutional monarchy on 6 May 1947.

Qualification
The qualifications to be a candidate for the National Assembly are outlined in Article 76 of the 1993 Constitution. 
 The candidate must be a citizen of Cambodia by birth only. 
 The citizen must be at the age of twenty-five or older on Election Day. 
 The candidate must be on the electoral register.

Power and privileges
Law Adoption
 Adopt and Amend laws for Cambodia and approve the national budget and administration accounts. (Article 90)
 Approve or repeal international treaties and conventions. (Article 90)
 Initiate legislation. (Article 91)
Vote of confidence
 Shall pass a vote of confidence in the Royal Government. (Article 90)
 Dismiss any members of the Council of Ministers, or the Royal Government, by a motion of censure passed by an absolute majority vote of all Members of the National Assembly. (Article 98)
Oversight
 Shall have the right to propose questions to the Royal Government. The replies by the ministers or by the Prime Minister may be given orally or in writing. The replies shall be provided within seven days after the day the question is received. (Article 96)
 Oversee royal government performance and invite high-ranking officials to clarify important special issues to the National Assembly. (Article 89)
 The commissions of the National Assembly may invite any minister to clarify issues in fields under his/her responsibility. (Article 97)
 Oversee the law enforcement.
Representative
 The Members of the National Assembly shall represent all the Khmer people, not only citizens from their constituencies. (Article 77)
 Play an important role in helping citizens have their voice in society and to bring people’s concern and needs for decisions to the National Assembly.
 Intervene and solve problems faced by citizens.
 Member of Parliament have the right to express opinions in the exercise of his/her duties protected by “Parliamentary Immunity” and shall not be prosecuted, detained or arrested because of opinions expressed in the exercise of his/her duties, except in case of flagrante delicto offences. (Article 80)

Commissions

See also
 Parliament of Cambodia
 Senate of Cambodia
 Council of Ministers
 Politics of Cambodia
 List of legislatures by country

References

External links
National Assembly Homepage (in Khmer)
National Assembly of the Kingdom of Cambodia
 EU Election Observation Mission to Cambodia - 2003

1993 establishments in Cambodia
Cambodia
Parliament of Cambodia